Timbuktu! is a musical, with lyrics by George Forrest and Robert Wright, set to music by Borodin, Forrest and Wright. The book is by Luther Davis. It is a resetting of Forrest and Wright's musical Kismet. The musical is set in 1361 in Timbuktu, in the Empire of Mali, West Africa.

Production
The musical premiered on Broadway at the Mark Hellinger Theatre on March 1, 1978, and closed on September 10, 1978, after 221 performances and 22 previews.

The original production starred Eartha Kitt as Shaleem-La-Lume, William Marshall as Hadji, Gilbert Price as the Mansa of Mali, Melba Moore as Marsinah, and George Bell as the Wazir. Ira Hawkins replaced Marshall prior to the Broadway opening. It was directed, choreographed and costume designed by Geoffrey Holder, with sets designed by Tony Straiges. Alan Eichler was associate producer. Gerald Bordman noted that the sets and costumes had "a Ziegfeldian opulence." New songs based on African folk music were added to provide "some tonal verisimiltude."

Following its Broadway run, it toured for more than a year with Kitt continuing in her starring role as Shaleem-La-Lume, Gregg Baker as Hadji, Bruce Hubbard as the Mansa and Vanessa Shaw as Marsinah.

Songs

Act I
 "Rhymes Have I" - Hadji, Marsinah and Beggars
 "Fate" - Hadji
 "In the Beginning, Woman" - Shaleem-La-Lume
 "Baubles, Bangles and Beads" - Marsinah and Merchants
 "Stranger in Paradise" - The Mansa of Mali and Marsinah
 "Gesticulate" - Hadji and Council
 "Night of My Nights" - The Mansa of Mali and Courtiers

Act II
 "My Magic Lamp" - Marsinah
 "Stranger in Paradise (Reprise)" - Marsinah
 "Rahadlakum" - Shaleem-La-Lume and Ladies of the Harem
 "And This Is My Beloved" - Hadji, Marsinah, The Mansa of Mali and The Wazir
 "Golden Land, Golden Life" - Chief Policeman and Nobles of the Court
 "Zubbediya" - Zubbediya, Princess, Marriage Candidates and Acrobat
 "Night of My Nights (Reprise)" - The Mansa of Mali, Marsinah, Hadji and Nobles of the Court
 "Sands of Time" - Hadji and Shaleem-La-Lume

Awards and nominations
1978 Tony Award nominations
 Tony Award for Best Actor in a Musical - Gilbert Price 
 Tony Award for Best Actress in a Musical - Eartha Kitt 
 Tony Award for Best Costume Design - Geoffrey Holder 
 Tony Award for Most Innovative Production of a Revival - Luther Davis

1978 Drama Desk Award nominations
 Drama Desk Award for Outstanding Choreography - Geoffrey Holder 
 Drama Desk Award Outstanding Costume Design - Geoffrey Holder

References

External links
 
Production information and synopsis at MTI Shows
 "Eartha Kitt Entrance-Timbuktu 1978!" YouTube clip.

1978 musicals
All-Black cast Broadway shows
Broadway musicals
Plays set in the 14th century
Timbuktu in popular culture